Baddam Bal Reddy was a Bharatiya Janata Party activist from Telangana and three time MLA from Karwan (Assembly constituency)  of Telangana Legislative Assembly. He won the seat in 1985, 1989 and 1994 assembly elections. In 2004 he was the target of an assassination attempt by members of a group trained by the ISI. One of the conspirators Syed Zakir Raheem was arrested in 2017 while the main accused, Farhat Ullah Ghori, is a fugitive.

Members of Legislative Assembly

See also 
 Darsgah-Jihad-O-Shahadat

References

External links
 Baddam Bal Reddy affidavit

Living people
Telugu politicians
Bharatiya Janata Party politicians from Telangana
Telangana politicians
Year of birth missing (living people)